Džombić is a Serbian surname. Notable people with the surname include:

Aleksandar Džombić (born 1968), Bosnian Serb politician
Damir Džombić (born 1985), Bosnian footballer

Serbian surnames